The women's parallel giant slalom competition of the FIS Snowboarding World Championships 2013 was held in Stoneham-et-Tewkesbury, Quebec on January 25, 2013. 46 athletes from 19 countries competed.

Medalists

Results

Qualification
Each participant takes one run on either of the courses. After the first run, only the top 16 are allowed a second run on the opposite course.

Elimination round

References

Parallel giant slalom, women's